Allegiant may refer to:

Allegiant Air, an American airline
Allegiant Stadium, in Paradise, NV
Allegiant (novel), a 2013 novel by Veronica Roth
The Divergent Series: Allegiant, a 2016 film based on the 2013 novel

See also
 Allegiance (disambiguation)